Punishment for Decadence is the second album by the Swiss thrash metal band Coroner, released on 1 August 1988. It bears many similarities to the previous album, except the band's performance is more precise and features increased use of slightly more melodic guitar work, as well as a slightly different lyrical style.

Track listing

Personnel
All information is taken from the CD liner notes of the 1988 release.

Coroner
Ron Broder (as Ron Royce) – vocals, bass
Tommy Vetterli (as Tommy T. Baron) – guitars
Marky Edelmann (Marquis Marky) – drums

Additional musicians
 Gary Marlowe – synthersizer, effects
 Dexter – backing vocals, assistant engineer

Production
 Guy Bidmead – producer, engineer
 Andreas Gerhard – assistant engineer
 Marquis Marky – cover, concept and design, photo credits
 Micha Good – skull logo
 Auguste Rodin – front cover sculpture

Notes
Track 10 is a Jimi Hendrix cover, and was originally included as a B-Side on the "Masked Jackal" single.
The album's artwork features a close-up portion of The Gates of Hell by the French sculptor Auguste Rodin
The album has been re-released with an alternative cover, without the consent of the band, featuring a portion of the woodcut "Der Tod als Würger" by German painter Alfred Rethel.
The second 12" vinyl and cassette pressings by Noise Records, the 12" vinyl and cassette release by Maze Music and the cassette release by Accord excludes "Purple Haze"
The 1988 unofficial cassette release by RC excludes the "Intro" song and "Purple Haze"
The 1988 unofficial cassette release by Baron Music misspells the album's title as "Ponishment for Decedance"
The Japanese releases contains the 1989 album No More Color
The 2014 reissue by Death Cult Switzerland features the original cover
A music video was made for "Masked Jackal"

References

External links
 BNR Metal Pages' section on Coroner
 Fan page with detailed album information and lyrics
 Coroner @ Last.fm

Coroner (band) albums
1988 albums
Noise Records albums